Emma More is a South African politician and former Member of Parliament for the main opposition Democratic Alliance between 2009 and 2014. She then served as a DA councillor in the City of Johannesburg between 2014 and 2016.

More later left DA to join ActionSA. After the 2021 municipal elections, she again became a PR councillor in Johannesburg.

References

Living people
Democratic Alliance (South Africa) politicians
Members of the National Assembly of South Africa
Women members of the National Assembly of South Africa
Year of birth missing (living people)